Herle may refer to:
 Heerlen, a city in the Netherlands
 Herle (surname), a list of people with the name

See also 
 Herl, a municipality in Germany
 Harle (disambiguation)